The Quincy Indians were a minor league baseball team that existed from 1928 to 1933. They were located in Quincy, Illinois. From 1928 to 1932, they played in the Class B Illinois–Indiana–Iowa League, and in 1933, they played in the Class B Mississippi Valley League. The Indians' ballpark was Eagles Stadium.

Year-by-year record

References

Defunct baseball teams in Illinois
Defunct minor league baseball teams
Sports teams in Quincy, Illinois
1928 establishments in Illinois
Baseball teams established in 1928
1933 disestablishments in Illinois
Baseball teams disestablished in 1933
Illinois-Indiana-Iowa League teams
Mississippi Valley League teams